Teen Fit Camp was an Australian reality show broadcast by Network Ten. It followed a group of overweight Australian teenagers chosen to participate in a special weight loss program.

Broadcast
Teen Fit Camp premiered in June 2007 on Ten in the Thursday 7:30pm time slot. However, despite critical acclaim, after several weeks the series was replaced by Pirate Master and the remaining episodes were aired during a Sunday afternoon slot.

References

2007 Australian television series debuts
2007 Australian television series endings
2000s Australian reality television series
Network 10 original programming
Television shows set in California